Simone Pianigiani (born 31 May 1969) is an Italian professional basketball coach currently acting as a team consultant for the Beijing Ducks of the Chinese Basketball Association.

Coaching career

Pro clubs
Pianigiani was appointed the head coach of the Italian League club Montepaschi Siena before the 2006–07 season, and led his team to the Italian League championship in all six of his seasons on the bench. He was named the Italian League's Best Coach in 2007.

The 2008–09 Italian League season was especially notable, as Montepaschi won the Italian SuperCup before the season, the Italian Cup at mid-season, and won the Italian League championship, by sweeping all three of their playoff series. In 44 Italian domestic games that season, they lost only once – at Fortitudo Bologna, in an Italian League game.
As head coach in Siena, he reached the Euroleague Final Four twice (2008 and 2011).

In the summer of 2012, he signed a two-year contract with Fenerbahçe Ülker. He resigned from his position as manager of Fenerbahçe Ülker in February 2013, citing personal issues. At the time of his resignation, the team was in the top spot of the Turkish Basketball League; however, they were only in 7th place out of 8 teams in the top 16 stage of the EuroLeague.

In June 2016, he signed a two-year contract with Hapoel Jerusalem. He led Hapoel to win the Israeli national championship and to reach the Eurocup semifinal.

After one season, he parted ways with Hapoel, and signed a three-year contract with Olimpia Milano.

On September 13, 2020, Beijing Ducks announced Pianigiani as their new head coach, replacing Yannis Christopoulos.

Italian national team
Pianigiani became the head coach of the senior men's Italian national basketball team in 2009, which he coached until 2015. He coached Italy at the EuroBasket 2011, the EuroBasket 2013, and the EuroBasket 2015.

Coaching record

EuroLeague

|- 
| align="left"|Montepaschi
| align="left"|2007–08
| 24 || 17 || 7 ||  || align="center"|Won in 3rd place game
|- 
| align="left"|Montepaschi
| align="left"|2008–09
| 20 || 13 || 7 ||  || align="center"|Eliminated in quarterfinals
|- 
| align="left"|Montepaschi
| align="left"|2009–10
| 16 || 11 || 5 ||  || align="center"|Eliminated in Top 16 stage
|- 
| align="left"|Montepaschi
| align="left"|2010–11
| 22 || 16 || 6 ||  || align="center"|Won in 3rd place game
|- 
| align="left"|Montepaschi
| align="left"|2011–12
| 20 || 13 || 7 ||  || align="center"|Eliminated in quarterfinals
|- 
| align="left"|Fenerbahçe
| align="left"|2012–13
| 18 || 7 || 11 ||  || align="center"|Eliminated in Top 16 stage
|- 
| align="left"|Milano
| align="left"|2017–18
| 30 || 10 || 20 ||  || align="center"|Eliminated in regular season
|- 
| align="left"|Milano
| align="left"|2018–19
| 30 || 14 || 16 ||  || align="center"|Eliminated in regular season
|-class="sortbottom"
| align="center" colspan=2|Career||180||101||79||||

Honors and titles
Head coach
Italian League Champion: 6
Mens Sana Siena: 2007, 2008, 2009, 2010, 2011
Olimpia Milano: 2018
Italian SuperCup Winner: 7
Mens Sana Siena: 2007, 2008, 2009, 2010, 2011
Olimpia Milano: 2017, 2018
 Italian Cup Winner: 3
Mens Sana Siena: 2009, 2010, 2011
EuroLeague Final Four Participation: 2
Mens Sana Siena: 2008, 2011
Turkish Cup Winner:
Fenerbahçe Ülker: 2013
Israeli Premier League Champion:
Hapoel Jerusalem: 2017
Israeli League Cup Winner:
Hapoel Jerusalem: 2016

Assistant coach
Saporta Cup Champion:
Mens Sana Siena: 2002
Italian League Champion:
Mens Sana Siena: 2004
Italian SuperCup Winner:
Mens Sana Siena: 2004–05
EuroLeague Final Four Participation: 2
Mens Sana Siena: 2003, 2004
Youth coach
Italian Youth Tournaments:
Cadets: 2
Mens Sana Siena: 2002, 2003
Juniors: 2
Mens Sana Siena: 2004, 2005
Under 20:
Mens Sana Siena: 2006

References

External links
 Simone Pianigiani at euroleague.net
 Simone Pianigiani at legabasket.it

1969 births
Living people
Basketbol Süper Ligi head coaches
Fenerbahçe basketball coaches
Hapoel Jerusalem B.C. coaches
Italian basketball coaches
Mens Sana Basket coaches
Sportspeople from Siena